Zindalii is an Algerian musical genre.  It is a type of folk music from the city of Constantine. As a type of music, recordings of zindalii are very rare .

See also
 Music of Algeria
 Arab music

Algerian music